The World Golf Village (WGV) is a golf resort in St. Johns County, Florida, United States, located between Jacksonville and St. Augustine. It was created by the PGA Tour and showcases the World Golf Hall of Fame. In addition to the resort the World Golf Village features residential and commercial developments. There is also a census-designated place with the same name.

Development
The  parcel was approved in the 1990s as a "Development of Regional Impact" (DRI) under Section 380.06 of the Florida Statutes, and eventually have 18,000 residents. A new interchange on Interstate 95 in Florida was constructed to permit direct access to the site, which was expected to host a million visitors each year.

Kelly Lake was created at the center of the village, surrounded by a  brick Walk of Champions, which features a large flagstone for each Hall of Fame member, with their name and signature etched in granite. A large building on the west side houses the hall of fame, theater, cafe and 110-foot shrine tower. The "Shops of World Golf Village" are situated on the north and east sides, and the Renaissance Hotel and convention center are to the south.

World Golf Foundation
The Ladies Professional Golf Association created a hall of fame in 1951. It was inactive until 1967, when it moved into a physical location in Augusta, Georgia and was renamed the LPGA Tour Hall of Fame. In the early 1990s, the PGA Tour was contemplating a Hall of Fame close to their north Florida headquarters. Deane Beman asked LPGA commissioner Charlie Mechem if there was interest in a joint Golf Hall of Fame. When they responded in the affirmative, the United States Golf Association was contacted, as was The Royal and Ancient Golf Club of St Andrews. Both agreed to collaborate, and PGA of America closed the Pinehurst World Golf Hall of Fame, while the LPGA decided to merge their HOF into the new facility.

An independent entity, the World Golf Foundation (WGF), was formed in 1994 to promote and honor the game and those who made significant contributions. The Board of Directors included representatives from the world's major golf organizations. The WGF owns and controls the World Golf Hall of Fame.

Hall of Fame
The foremost attraction at World Golf Village is the World Golf Hall of Fame, which superseded the PGA of America facility at Pinehurst, North Carolina in May 1998. 
The Hall of Fame has a permanent display with biographical information for every individual inducted. There are also sections devoted to the history of golf, heritage, organizations, course design, equipment, attire and trends. The Trophy Tower contains a collection of all the major tournament trophies (and many of the minor ones). Many of the displays are interactive and give the visitor a "hands on" experience. Featured exhibits change yearly, and a round on the 18-hole putting course is included with museum admission. Additionally, there is a Challenge Hole with an island green similar to the signature hole at TPC Sawgrass, the par 3, 17th.

Golf

Courses
The resort features two championship golf courses: the King & Bear, designed jointly by Arnold Palmer and Jack Nicklaus, and the Slammer & Squire, a collaboration of Sam Snead and Gene Sarazen. Both courses consistently receive 4.5 stars rating (out of 5) by Golf Digest. Both courses have hosted professional tournaments including the Liberty Mutual Legends of Golf, a Champions Tour event, and Shell's Wonderful World of Golf, as well as other nationally televised events.

Academy
The PGA TOUR Golf Academy opened at WGV in 2000 as a one-stop facility to help players improve all facets of their golf game. Their instructors are experienced PGA and LPGA professionals who provide clinics, schools, private lessons, development programs and camps for juniors using the latest technology.

Based on the success of the program, branches have been established at TPC Sawgrass, TPC Scottsdale, TPC Las Vegas, TPC San Antonio and six other resort locations in the United States. The academy at World Golf Village trains and certifies all instructors at TOUR academies.

Accommodations
Four hotels/motels were constructed in anticipation of tourism at the center. The largest is the Renaissance Resort at World Golf Village, followed by the Laterra Resort & Spa. The Grande Villas and The Residences at World Golf Village also provide unique accommodations.

Attractions
One of the most popular attractions is the IMAX Theater, which plays the latest movies and documentaries in a 300-seat theater with an -wide by six-story-high screen.

The Murray Brothers Caddyshack restaurant is located along the Walk of Champions and is owned by actor Bill Murray and his five brothers. Their slogan is, "Eat, Drink and Be Murray!"

Villagio Bar and Grill and a Starbucks are located within the Renaissance Resort. The Fairways Café is part of the World Golf Hall of Fame and offers casual and takeout fare.

The  PGA Tour Stop (now closed) was situated along the Walk of Champions, and was the largest golf store in Florida.

Historic St. Augustine and the beaches of the Atlantic Ocean are nearby, and WGV is part of the Greater Jacksonville Metropolitan Area, with over 1 million residents.

Education

The community is within the St. Johns County School District.

Zoned elementary schools include: Mill Creek Academy,
Picolata Crossing, and Wards Creek.

Boundaries of two middle schools include portions of World Golf Village: Mill Creek and Pacetti Bay:

All residents are zoned to Tocoi Creek High School.

Other development
The  St. Johns County Convention Center was constructed within the WGV and is connected to the Renaissance Resort. An assisted living facility for aging golfers, Westminster St. Augustine, is located nearby. A timeshare sales office is located on-site, and several nearby subdivisions will sell homes or homesites to golfers looking for a Florida vacation home.

References

External links

Buildings and structures in St. Johns County, Florida
Golf clubs and courses in Florida
Golf clubs and courses designed by Bobby Weed
PGA Tour
Golf clubs and courses in the Jacksonville metropolitan area
Resorts in Florida
Planned communities in Florida
Hotels in Florida
Tourist attractions in St. Johns County, Florida
1998 establishments in Florida
Gene Sarazen
Arnold Palmer
Hotels in the Jacksonville metropolitan area